Hakai is the first studio album from Hiroshi Kyono as Wagdug Futuristic Unity and was released on July 23, 2008. The album is the follow-up to the 2007 EP Nu Riot. The song with Justice is a remake of their most popular song, "Waters of Nazareth". Another track from the album, "Systematic People", was released as a single and also used as the opening theme for the anime series Kurozuka.

Track listing
 Hakai (featuring DJ Starscream) (Hakai version)
 Got Life
 Systematic People (featuring Maximum the Ryo) (DUG version)
 Why? (featuring Ceephax)
 Mad Saturator
 Ill Machine (featuring Ultra Brain) (Hakai version)
 G.O.D. Space
 Wall (featuring Chino Moreno)
 Mass Compression (featuring Ultra Brain)
 Chaostic Radio
 Rise It! (featuring Funkygong)
 X-Stereo (featuring Justice)
 Nu World (featuring Numanoid vs. Mazda)
Bonus Tracks
14. Weapons of Wag Distortion (featuring Com.A)
15. Systematic People (featuring Maximum the Ryo) (WAG version)

Personnel
Hiroshi Kyono - vocals, lyrics, synth

Guest appearances
Ceephax
Funkygong
Justice
Chino Moreno
Numanoid vs. Mazda
Maximum the Ryo
DJ Starscream
Ultra Brain

References

External links
 Official Wagdug Futuristic Unity Website

Hiroshi Kyono albums
2008 albums